, literally "Yonako Large Waterfalls"  ) is a waterfall located in Yonako, Suzaka City, Nagano Prefecture, in the central part of Japan. The falls originate from Mount Azumaya and Mount Neko.

The Falls
Both falls combine to make the Yonako River, which is one of the tributaries of the Chikuma River, the upper stream of Japan's longest river, the Shinano River, which flows into the Sea of Japan at Niigata City.

Yonako Falls is one of "Japan’s Top 100 Waterfalls", in a listing published by the Japanese Ministry of the Environment in 1990.

The view of the falls, 900 meters away from the slag ground of the former Yonako Sulfur Mines (Japanese: 米子硫黄鉱山), which has been converted to a park, is said to be excellent, especially during the autumn leaves season.

Access
From Suzaka-Nagano East exit of the Jōshin-etsu Expressway, via National Routes 403 and 406, to the falls' toll-free parking lot is about 40 minutes.

References

External links

 Large Falls of Yonako, Suzaka (Suzaka City Tourism Association)
 Ministry of Environment 

Waterfalls of Japan
Geography of Nagano Prefecture
Tourist attractions in Nagano Prefecture
Suzaka, Nagano